Sakstagals Parish is an administrative unit of Rēzekne Municipality, Latvia.

Towns, villages and settlements of Sakstagals parish 
  -parish administrative center

References 

Parishes of Latvia
Rēzekne Municipality